Eef Ruisch (26 July 1906 – 24 October 1976) was a Dutch footballer. He played in seven matches for the Netherlands national football team from 1926 to 1928.

References

External links
 

1906 births
1976 deaths
Dutch footballers
Netherlands international footballers
Place of birth missing
Association footballers not categorized by position